The Stepfather is a two-part British television crime drama series, written by Simon Booker and directed by Ashley Pearce, that first broadcast on ITV on 6 February 2005. The series, which stars Philip Glenister and Lindsey Coulson, follows divorcee Dougie Molloy (Glenister), a man haunted by the disappearance of his fifteen-year-old daughter, who three years on, tries to rebuild his life by marrying a fellow divorcee, Maggie Shields (Coulson). But when Maggie's daughter Scarlett disappears in similar circumstances, Molloy's possible involvement in both crimes is investigated by the police.

The series was filmed in and around Soho, London. The series was later broadcast in Sweden, Australia, Brazil (under the title O Padrosato) and France (under the title Suspicion). The series gathered respectable viewing figures, with 6.7 million tuning in for the first episode, and a further million tuning in for the second episode. Notably, the series has yet to be released on DVD.

Cast
 Philip Glenister as Dougie Molloy
 Robert Bathurst as Christopher Veazey
 Lindsey Coulson as Maggie Shields
 Lucy Evans as Scarlett Veazey
 Jack Wilson as Luke Schofield
 Con O'Neill as Bruce Shapiro
 Janine Carrington as Anita Gibson
 John Rowe as George Saville
 Vashti MacLachlan as Kath Schofield
 Anna Wilson-Jones as Sasha Munro 
 Holly Davidson as Pippa Molloy
 John Bowe as DI Mendoza
 Abigail Thaw as DS Sullivan
 Vanessa Knox-Mawer as Mrs. Porter
 Trish Cooke as Mrs. Gibson
 Thea Day as Nikki
 Ricky Nixon as Woody
 Lucy Brooks as Tracey Ann
 Lewis Yarwood	as Ryan
 Frankie Fitzgerald as Beemer

Episodes

References

External links

2005 British television series debuts
2005 British television series endings
2000s British drama television series
ITV television dramas
2000s British television miniseries
Television series by ITV Studios
Television shows produced by Granada Television
English-language television shows
Television shows set in London